Prasart Museum is a private museum in Bang Kapi District, Bangkok that exhibits historic Thai antiques and artifacts. It also contains replicas of prominent Thai architecture.

References

Further reading

Museums in Bangkok
Bang Kapi district
Decorative arts museums